Zivilprozessordnung (ZPO) is the Austrian code of civil procedure. It was drafted in 1895 by Franz Klein, and superseded the Josephinian Common Court Regulations (Allgemeine Gerichtsordnung (AGO)) of 1781.

Principles 
The Austrian litigious proceedings (Streitiges Verfahren) are governed by the following principles:

 Orality and publicity (Grundsatz der Mündlichkeit und der Öffentlichkeit): The proceedings are oral and public.
 Fair procedure (Grundsatz des beiderseitigen rechtlichen Gehörs): audiatur et altera pars.
 Adversarial system (Dispositionsgrundsatz): The parties determine the commencement and subject of action.
 Ex officio proceedings (Grundsatz des Amtsbetriebs): The conduct of legal proceedings and the service of process rests with the court.
 Cooperative principle (Kooperationsgrundsatz): The parties and the court cooperate by making factual claims, presenting evidence, and by exercising actions of procedural authority.
 Immediacy principle (Unmittelbarkeitsgrundsatz): Only the judge before whom litigation takes place may take evidence and decide.
 Free consideration of evidence (freie Beweiswürdigung): The judge decides freely on which facts he considers proven.
 Procedural economy (Prozessökonomie): Principles governing a speedy and focused procedure.
 Freedom of assertion (Freiheit des Vorbringens): The parties are free to present facts and evidence and to file motions until the end of the oral proceedings.
 Duty to bring matters to court in good time (Prozessförderungspflicht): The parties are obliged to present their pleadings timely and completely, in order for the proceedings to proceed quickly.
 Interdiction of novation (Neuerungsverbot): The presentation of evidence and the making of factual claims are restricted to first instance proceedings.

References 

Law of Austria
Codes of civil procedure